
Helan may refer to:

Places
Helan, Mandi Bahauddin, a union council in Phalia Tehsil, Mandi Bahauddin District, Punjab Province, Pakistan

Iran
Helan-e Safarali, a village in Chahardangeh Rural District, Hurand District, Ahar County, East Azerbaijan Province
Helan, Bostanabad, a village in Mehranrud-e Jonubi Rural District, Central District, Bostanabad County, East Azerbaijan Province
Helan, Vargahan, a village in Vargahan Rural District, Central District, Ahar County, East Azerbaijan Province

China
Helan Mountains (贺兰山), in the northwest of China 
Helan County (贺兰县), in Yinchuan, Ningxia
Helan, Liaoning (河栏镇), a town in Liaoyang County, Liaoning

People
Princess Dowager Helan (賀蘭太后, 351-396), princess dowager of Northern Wei in imperial China
Serge Hélan (born 1964), French triple jumper